Pol Borideh may refer to:
 Pol Borideh, Chaharmahal and Bakhtiari
 Pol Borideh, Khuzestan